James Holliday (January 19, 1818 – May 16, 1851) was an American lawyer and politician.

Early life 
Holliday was born in Wayne Township, Mifflin County, Pennsylvania.

Career 
Holliday studied law and was admitted to the Pennsylvania bar. In 1843, Holliday moved to Milwaukee, Wisconsin Territory, and practiced law. In 1847 and 1848, he served in the Wisconsin Territorial House of Representatives and helped prepare the second Wisconsin Constitutional Convention of 1847.

Personal life 
Holliday died suddenly in Milwaukee during a court session of a heart attack.

References

1818 births
1851 deaths
People from Mifflin County, Pennsylvania
Politicians from Milwaukee
Pennsylvania lawyers
Wisconsin lawyers
Members of the Wisconsin Territorial Legislature
19th-century American politicians
Lawyers from Milwaukee
19th-century American lawyers